Patrick Sagisi is a backstroke, butterfly and freestyle swimmer from Guam. In the 1996 Summer Olympics, he participated in the men's 100 m butterfly, but failed to advance from his heat, finishing in 51st place with a time of 56.93. He also represented Guam at the 1988 Summer Olympics and 1992 Summer Olympics, but never advanced out of his heat.

References 
 Patrick Sagisi – Olympic profile on Sports-Reference.com

External links
 

1971 births
Living people
Guamanian male backstroke swimmers
Guamanian male butterfly swimmers
Guamanian male freestyle swimmers
Olympic swimmers of Guam
Swimmers at the 1988 Summer Olympics
Swimmers at the 1992 Summer Olympics
Swimmers at the 1996 Summer Olympics